The aim of the National Youth Council (NYC) is to work with the Red Cross Youth Department to develop among the youth the spirit of humanitarianism and social service by giving them opportunities to participate in relevant Red Cross activities within the framework of the organization. The NYC is composed of nine (9) youth leaders, representing nine (9) different regional areas, elected during the National Youth Congress held every two years.

Objectives
 Work with the PRC Management in formulation of policies and programs concerning the youth and the National Society
 To serve as a focal point of coordination of the Chapter Youth Councils (CYC)
 To assist and advise the CYC in the development and promotion of RCY Programs

NYC Areas of Responsibilities

National Youth Council Presidents

National Youth Congress

National Youth Council Officers

1975-1976

1977-1978

1979-1981

1982-1983

1985-1987

1988-1990

1990-1992

1992-1994

1994-1996

1997-1998

1999-2000

2000-2002

2002-2005

2005-2007

2007-2009

2009-2011

2011-2013

2013-2015

2015

2015-2017

2017-2019

2019-2021

2021-2023

References

External links
 Philippine Red Cross - Red Cross Youth Department
 RCY Volunteer Facebook
 Red Cross Youth Fan Page
 Red Cross Youth - Philippines Facebook Group

International Red Cross and Red Crescent Movement
Youth organizations based in the Philippines